Xiangyang is a town of Ziyang County, Shaanxi, China. , it has one residential community and 12 villages under its administration.

References

Township-level divisions of Shaanxi
Ziyang County